Sam Blatherwick (16 October 1888 – 2 January 1975) was a British swimmer. He competed in two events at the 1908 Summer Olympics.

References

1888 births
1975 deaths
British male swimmers
Olympic swimmers of Great Britain
Swimmers at the 1908 Summer Olympics
Sportspeople from Sheffield